Ilija Katić (born 20 July 1945) is a former professional footballer and coach.

Career
He began playing with his home-town club FK Mladost Hasići. In 1962 he joined FK Borac Šamac where he stayed two seasons. He joined NK Osijek in 1964, named NK Slavonija back then, and played in the Yugoslav Second League. In 1967, he moved to giants FK Partizan where stayed until 1973 and became a national team player.

In 1973, he moved abroad and joined Swiss side FC Zürich where he played the next three seasons. In 1976, he played one season in Spain with La Liga side Burgos CF and later returned to Switzerland and played in top league sides Neuchâtel Xamax and FC La Chaux-de-Fonds. He finished his career in Liechtenstein and became a coach.

National team
He played four matches for the Yugoslav national team in 1968 and 1969.

Honours

Club
FC Zürich
 Swiss Super League (3): 1973–74, 1974–75, 1975–76
 Swiss Cup: 1975–76

Individual
 Swiss Super League Best Foreign Player (2): 1974–75, 1975–76
 Swiss Super League top scorer: 1974–75 (23 goals)

References

1945 births
Living people
People from Šamac, Bosnia and Herzegovina
Serbs of Bosnia and Herzegovina
Yugoslav footballers
Yugoslavia international footballers
Association football forwards
NK Osijek players
FK Partizan players
FC Zürich players
Burgos CF (1936) footballers
FC La Chaux-de-Fonds players
Neuchâtel Xamax FCS players
Yugoslav First League players
Swiss Super League players
La Liga players
Serbian footballers
Serbian expatriate footballers
Expatriate footballers in Switzerland
Expatriate footballers in Spain
Serbian football managers
Yugoslav football managers
FC La Chaux-de-Fonds managers
Mediterranean Games gold medalists for Yugoslavia
Competitors at the 1971 Mediterranean Games
Mediterranean Games medalists in football